Alai Kalaniuvalu (born October 23, 1971) is a former American football guard in the National Football League (NFL) for the Atlanta Falcons, Washington Redskins, Philadelphia Eagles, and the Denver Broncos.

He played college football at Oregon State University and was drafted in the third round of the 1994 NFL Draft by the Atlanta Falcons. Kalaniuvalu attended Kaimuki High School in Honolulu, Hawaii before moving to Seattle, Washington where he attended Franklin High where he was a two-time All Metro League selection. He attended Walla Walla CC (WA) before transferring to Oregon State.

Kalaniuvalu attended summer camp with the Atlanta Falcons in 1994 and was released before the start of the regular season. He was then claimed by the Washington Redskins and placed on injured reserve. Later in the season, he was claimed off waivers from the Redskins by the Green Bay Packers and was placed on their practice squad.

1971 births
American people of Tongan descent
Living people
American football offensive guards
Atlanta Falcons players
Denver Broncos players
Oregon State Beavers football players
Philadelphia Eagles players
Washington Redskins players
Players of American football from Honolulu
Franklin High School (Seattle) alumni